Thinakaran is a daily Tamil newspaper in Sri Lanka. It is published by Associated Newspapers of Ceylon Limited. Its sister newspaper are Sunday Observer, Silumina, Dinamina and Daily News. The daily newspaper has a circulation of 50,000 and its Sunday version, Thinakaran Varamanjari, 70,000 per issue.

See also
List of newspapers in Sri Lanka

References

External links
Thinakaran official website

Associated Newspapers of Ceylon Limited
Daily newspapers published in Sri Lanka
Publications established in 1932
Tamil-language newspapers published in Sri Lanka